Nervous Gender is an American punk rock electronic band formed in Los Angeles in 1978 by Gerardo Velazquez, Edward Stapleton, Phranc and Michael Ochoa.

Their use of heavily distorted keyboards and synthesizers made them, along with The Screamers, one of the original innovators of what is today called "electropunk", although they could equally be considered an early industrial group. The group was confrontational and experimental.

Phranc's androgynous appearance was the embodiment of the group's name, garnered the band much press in zines such as Slash and, later, proving inspirational to founders of the queercore movement. Despite their somewhat high profile, the groups' habit of provoking the audience, obscene material and harsh erotics guaranteed they would never gain commercial acceptance. At their first show in 1979, a benefit for the Women's Video Center, Phranc called the audience "pussies" and "dykes" when the band was requested to stop playing.

History 

The band were formed in Los Angeles, California, in 1978 by Gerardo Velazquez, Edward Stapleton, Phranc and Michael Ochoa. In 1979, Don Bolles of the Germs joined as drummer. The following year, Phranc left the band and Paul Roessler of the Screamers joined. At this time they recorded the tracks for the compilation Live at Target, released as an LP and a video, both seminal not only in the punk scene but also as early industrial recordings; fellow contributors Factrix and Z'EV (listed on this recording as "UNS") were early industrial acts, and Nervous Gender found more acceptance among that scene initially. All the artists involved in Live at Target were experimenting with atonality, noise and concepts not common until post-punk groups emerged later. Nervous Gender played with bands such as SPK, Factrix, Non, Einstürzende Neubauten, and Psychic TV during the early 1980s.

In 1981 they released their LP Music from Hell, which included guest vocalist Alice Bag from Bags singing on "Alice's Song". Nervous Gender did not record in the studio again. After the LP came out, Paul Roessler moved to New York City to play with the Nina Hagen Band and was replaced by Bill Cline, and Don Bolles left the band to play with 45 Grave. He was replaced by an eight-year-old boy, Sven Pfeiffer. In 1982, Sven was deported alongside their mother and both returned to live in Germany. During their career Nervous Gender was called by one critic, "...the thorn in the side of the L.A. music scene..."

During the mid-1980s, the band was on the verge of breaking up when members of Wall of Voodoo Bruce Moreland, Marc Moreland and Chas Grey, who were fans, stepped in and offered to collaborate with them. It was at this point that a guitar-driven version of Nervous Gender emerged. During this time Dinah Cancer of 45 Grave was a frequent guest performer with them, and they played shows with bands such as Christian Death, Super Heroines, Kommunity FK and Gobsheit (a side project of Stapleton's with Patrice Repose) at venues such as the Anti Club. In 1988, Edward Stapleton played his last show with the band.

In early 1990, original members Gerardo Velasquez and Michael Ochoa along with Joe Zinnato (a long time Ochoa collaborator) revived Nervous Gender as a trio. This formation did a series of 8 performances, and were working on what would have been the final Nervous Gender album (working title "American Regime") with producer Paul B. Cutler (of 45 Grave). The final performance of Nervous Gender was on August 26, 1991, at Club A.S.S. in Silverlake, CA. Gerardo Velasquez died on March 28, 1992, at age 33.

After Gerardo's death, members Ochoa and Zinnato, with the addition of singer Claire Lawrence – Slater (of Honeymoon Killers, Huge Killer Ships), formed "HighHeelTitWig" a punk-industrial-pop-grunge hybrid, which played a series of shows. In 1995 Joe Zinnato suffered a serious stroke which put an end to musical activities.

As of 2005, Edward Stapleton, Michael Ochoa and Joe Zinnato were reviewing all of the Nervous Gender material (studio, live and rehearsal recordings and performance videos) with an eye towards releasing a NG retrospective. At this time, Edward Stapleton (with Karene Stapleton) also recorded under the name Kali's Thugs. In 2007 the band reformed with Stapleton, Ochoa, Zinnato and Tammy Fraser.

As of 2017, Edward Stapleton, and Matt Comeione, San Diego Mod and Cal Arts trained composer started nervous gender reloaded.

Discography 
 Nervous Gender Reloaded on Bandcamp
(1980) on Subterranean Records
 Music from Hell (1981) on Subterranean Records
 Nervous Gender Archives, series of archival recordings available from Nervous Gender via their web site
 Nervous Gender Live at the Hong Kong Cafe 1979 (2006)
 Nervous Gender – Live at the Whiskey A Go-Go 1980 (2006)
 Nervous Gender Live at the Roxy 1986 (2006)
 Nervous Gender – Music from Hell 2009 Remixed / Remastered (2009) (Limited Edition CD Limited to 250 numbered copies)
 Gestalt / Green Tile Floors (Test Tube Records. 2011) 7 inch green vinyl 45 record. 2 songs from 1979 newly recorded for the first time in 2010. Engineered by Paul Roessler of the Screamers and former Nervous Gender member.
THE NERVOUS GENDER Eastside Punks is a film series about Los Angeles's other punk scene story https://www.facebook.com/razorcake/videos/262662958825298

 Music from Hell Music from Hell''''' is the first studio album by Los Angeles electropunk band Nervous Gender.
Side A (Martyr Complex)
 Monsters
 Nothing to Hide
 Cardinal Newman
 Fat Cow
 Alien Point of View
 People Like You
 Regress for You
Side B (Beelzebub Youth)
 Christian Lovers
 Exorcism
 Bathroom Sluts
 Pie on a Ledge
 Push, Push, Push
 Alice's Song

See also 
 List of musicians in the first wave of punk music

References

External links 
 
 Nervous Gender Reloaded
 Nervous Gender unofficial site
 Interview with Edward Stapleton
 2015 Nervous Gender interview
 Review of Live at Target

LGBT-themed musical groups
Punk rock groups from California
Electropunk musical groups
Queercore groups
Musical groups from Los Angeles
Musical groups established in 1978
1978 establishments in California